Charlotte Jane Uhlenbroek (born 16 May 1967) is a British zoologist and BBC television presenter.

Early life
Her Dutch father was an agricultural specialist with the United Nations who took his English wife and their family round the world with him. Uhlenbroek was born in London, but her parents moved to Ghana when she was only ten days old. Between the ages of 5–14 she lived in Kathmandu, Nepal.

Education and scientific work
Uhlenbroek attended Oakham School in Rutland, and then gained a BSc in Zoology and Psychology in 1988, followed in 1997 by a PhD in Zoology, at the University of Bristol. She spent six months in Burundi helping primatologist Jane Goodall set up a conservation project for chimpanzees, followed by four years in the forests of Gombe Stream National Park in Western Tanzania on the shores of Lake Tanganyika, studying the communication of wild chimpanzees. In 2007, Uhlenbroek was awarded an honorary degree from Oxford Brookes University for her work.

Television career
Spotted by the BBC Natural History Unit, Uhlenbroek made her UK television debut in the series Dawn to Dusk, presented by Jonathan Scott, in an episode on the chimpanzees of Gombe Stream National Park. She went on to present the BBC Two programme Chimpanzee Diary as part of the Animal Zone during 1998 and 1999. Uhlenbroek subsequently presented a number of documentaries (both series and one-off programmes) for the BBC, including: Cousins (2000), Congo's Secret Chimps (2001), Talking with Animals (2002), Jungle (2003), Secret Gorillas of Mondika (2005). In 2004, she was one of the subjects of the short documentary series The Way We Went Wild, about television's natural history presenters.

Uhlenbroek visited the Mefou National Park in Cameroon in 2006 to provide narration for Animal Planet's Going Ape TV series, based on the charity Ape Action Africa.

In 2007, she presented Safari School, a twenty-part BBC 2 "reality" series in which eight celebrities had to learn to become game rangers at the Shamwari Game Reserve. In 2009 she was associate producer for and presented Among the Apes, a four-part series on Five, each part concerning a different primate species.

In recent years she has made minor appearances on BBC nature programmes, written about elephant conservation in the Daily Mail and been involved with several conservation charities.

Synopsis

Personal life
Since 2006, she has been married to Daniel Rees, who works as a producer for the BBC Natural History Unit.

Uhlenbroek supports Animal Aid and their campaign against primate experiments, stating: "I have yet to hear a sufficiently compelling scientific argument that justifies the suffering inflicted on primates in medical research." She is also a supporter of many animal-orientated charities, including Ape Action Africa, Fauna and Flora International, For Life On Earth the Great Apes Survival Project, the Kathmandu Animal Treatment Centre and Compassion in World Farming.

Publications
The Structure and Function of the Long-distance Calls Given by Male Chimpanzees in Gombe National Park (PhD Thesis), 1995
Talking With Animals, 2002
Jungle, 2004
Animal Life (editor), 2008
Illustrated Encyclopedia of Animal Life, 2012

Uhlenbroek also wrote the introduction to Wildlife Portfolio of the Year: Volume Nine, one of an annual collection of prize-winning images.

References

External links
 
 Profile on BBC Nature 
 Charlotte Uhlenbroek: On living in the wild
 Charlotte Uhlenbroek's agent's page

People educated at Oakham School
Alumni of the University of Bristol
English people of Dutch descent
BBC television presenters
British television presenters
British zoologists
1967 births
Living people